Víctor Balaguer i Cirera (11 December 1824 – 14 January 1901) was a Spanish politician and author, was born at Barcelona (Catalonia, Spain) on 11 December 1824, and was educated at the university of his native city.

Biography 
His first dramatic essay, Pepín el jorobado, was placed on the Barcelona stage when he was fourteen years of age, and at nineteen he was publicly "crowned" after the production of his second play, Don Enrique el Dadivoso. From 1843 to 1868 he was the chief of the Liberal party in Barcelona, and as proprietor and editor of El Conseller did much to promote the growth of Catalan patriotism. But it was not till 1857 that he wrote his first poem in Catalan--a copy of verses to the Virgin of Montserrat. He was the author of Historia de Cataluña y de la Corona de Aragón in 5 volumes (Barcelona: Salvador Manero, 1860–63).

Henceforward he frequently adopted the pseudonym of "Lo Trovador de Montserrat"; in 1859 he helped to restore the "Jocs Florals", and in 1861 was proclaimed mestre en gay saber. He was removed to Madrid, took a prominent part in political life, and in 1867 emigrated to Provence.

On the expulsion of Queen Isabella II of Spain, he returned to Spain, represented Manresa in the Cortes, and in 1871—1872 was successively Overseas and Finance minister. He resigned office at the restoration, but finally followed his party in rallying to the dynasty; he was appointed vice-president of Congress, and was subsequently a senator. He died at Madrid on 14 January 1901.

See also 
 Biblioteca Museu Víctor Balaguer

References

1824 births
1901 deaths
Politicians from Barcelona
Liberal Party (Spain, 1880) politicians
Members of the Congress of Deputies (Spain)
Members of the Congress of Deputies of the Spanish Restoration
Members of the Senate of Spain
Spanish male writers
Renaixença writers
Members of the Royal Spanish Academy
Overseas ministers of Spain
Government ministers during the First Spanish Republic